Thirst (Atash) is a 2002 Iranian crime-drama film directed by Mohammad Hossein Farahbakhsh.

Plot 
The story of the film is about Nader who is released from prison and to execute a plan to steal a gold shop, he found two experts in opening the safe and electronics, and this group of three executes their plan skillfully, but…

Cast 
 Bahram Radan
 Fariborz Arabnia
 Shahram Haghighat Doost
 Shabnam Gholikhani
 Saghar Azizi
 Manouchehr Sadeghpour
 Tayeb Sherafati
 Majid Alizadeh
 Fatemeh Parhizkari
 Sanaz Shams
 Maryam Nikraftar
 Ebrahim Ezatkhah
 Vali Jamehbozorg
 Jalil Malekzadeh

References

External links

2002 films
2000s Persian-language films
Iranian drama films
2002 drama films